Sophie Gilliat-Ray, OBE, is professor of Religious and Theological Studies and Director for the Centre for the Study of Islam in the UK at Cardiff University.

Career 
Gilliat-Ray studied Religious studies and interfaith studies at the University of Wales, Lampeter, where she completed her PhD 'Perspectives on the Religious Identity of Muslims in Britain' in 1994. From 1994 until 1997 she was a research fellow in the department of sociology at the University of Warwick, and in 1998 at the University of Exeter. Since 1998 she has worked at Cardiff University, where she was promoted to professor in 2013. She is the director of the Centre for the Study of Islam in the UK.

She was the principal investigator on the AHRC-funded project 'Leadership and Capacity Building in the British Muslim Community: the case of 'Muslim Chaplains' (2008–12), She has also been the co-investigator on numerous other projects, including 'Understanding Religion and Law: Muslims, Fatwas and Muftis in the UK’ (with Robert Gleave and Mustafa Baig, 2016–17), 'Religion in multi-ethnic contexts: a multidisciplinary case study of global seafaring' (with Helen Anne Sampson, 2017–20)

Awards 

 Muslim Council of Wales achievement award (2012)
 Fellow of the Learned Society of Wales (2019)
 OBE for services to Education and Muslim Communities in Britain (2020)

Publications 

 2003. 'Nursing, professionalism, and spirituality', Journal of Contemporary Religion, 18:3, 335–349, DOI: 10.1080/13537900310001601695
 2005. ‘Sacralising’ Sacred Space in Public Institutions: A Case Study of the Prayer Space at the Millennium Dome', Journal of Contemporary Religion, 20:3, 357–372, DOI: 10.1080/13537900500249921 
 2010. Muslims in Britain. Cambridge University Press.  
 2011. 'Being there’ the experience of shadowing a British Muslim Hospital chaplain. Qualitative Research. 11(5), 469–486. doi:10.1177/1468794111413223  
 with Ali, M. M. and Pattison, S. 2013. Understanding Muslim Chaplaincy. Ashgate AHRC/ESRC Religion and Society Series.

References 

Religious studies scholars
Academics of Cardiff University
Officers of the Order of the British Empire
Alumni of the University of Wales
21st-century British non-fiction writers
21st-century Welsh women writers
21st-century Welsh writers
Year of birth missing (living people)
Living people